Trash is a 2014 crime drama thriller film directed by Stephen Daldry and written by Richard Curtis, based on the 2010 novel of the same name by Andy Mulligan. The film stars Rooney Mara, Martin Sheen, Wagner Moura, and Selton Mello.

Plot
Trash follows three Brazilian street teenagers in Rio de Janeiro; Raphael, Gardo, and Rat (Jun-Jun) who spend their time picking through litter in the hope of finding useful waste. One day they discover a wallet whose contents bring them into conflict with the brutal local police force as they find themselves unlikely whistleblowers in a city rife with corruption.

Cast
 Rooney Mara as Sister Olivia
 Martin Sheen as Father Juilliard
 Wagner Moura as José Angelo
 Selton Mello as Federico Gonz
Stepan Nercessian as Santos
 Rickson Tevez as Raphael
 Eduardo Luis as Gardo
 Gabriel Weinstein as Rat (Jun-Jun)
 Pedro Pauleey as The Cleaner
 Nelson Xavier as Jefferson
 Leandro Firmino as Thiago

Production
On 5 April 2011, Working Title Films and PeaPie Films acquired the film rights to Andy Mulligan's 2010 adventure thriller novel Trash. Screenwriter Richard Curtis was set to adapt the novel and Stephen Daldry was set to direct the film.

Casting
On 8 July 2013, Rooney Mara joined the cast to play the role of Olivia, an NGO worker. Martin Sheen signed up to play the role of Father Juilliard.

Filming
Principal photography began on 24 July 2013, in Rio de Janeiro, Brazil.

Marketing
The first trailer was released on 31 July 2014.

Release
The film was distributed outside of North America by Universal Pictures International. The film had its world premiere at the Rio de Janeiro International Film Festival on 7 October 2014.
It was released in Brazil on 9 October 2014. and in the United Kingdom on 30 January 2015. The film was released in the United States on 9 October 2015, by Focus World in a limited release and through video on demand.

Reception
The film's consensus states: "Action-packed, funny, and thought-provoking, Trash finds feel-good cinema in real-life squalor without resorting to cheap sentimentality." On Metacritic, the film holds a score of 50 out of 100, based on 18 reviews, indicating "mixed or average reviews".

Awards
 2015: BAFTA Award for Best Film Not in the English Language (nominated)
 2014: Rome Film Festival – BNL People's Choice Award: Gala (won)
 2014: Rome Film Festival – 'Alice in the City' Award (won)
 2014: Camerimage – Golden Frog: Main Competition (nominated)
 2014: Tallinn Black Nights Film Festival – Just Film Award: Best Youth Film (nominated)

References

External links
 

2014 films
2014 crime drama films
2014 thriller drama films
Brazilian crime drama films
Brazilian thriller drama films
British crime drama films
British thriller drama films
English-language Brazilian films
Films about children
Films about friendship
Films about miscarriage of justice
Films about poverty
Films based on British novels
Films based on crime novels
Films based on thriller novels
Films directed by Stephen Daldry
Films produced by Eric Fellner
Films produced by Tim Bevan
Films set in Rio de Janeiro (city)
Films shot in Rio de Janeiro (city)
Portuguese-language films
Films with screenplays by Richard Curtis
Working Title Films films
Films scored by Antônio Pinto
2010s English-language films
2010s British films